Aleh Rastsislavavich Mikhalovich Олег Михалович (born 1 August 1979 in Pervomaysky, Minsk) is a male Greco-Roman wrestler from Belarus. He participated in men's Greco-Roman 74 kg at the 2008 Summer Olympics. Mikhalovich defeated Poland's Julian Kwit and Kazakhstan's Roman Melyoshin in the first two rounds, until he lost to China's Chang Yongxiang in the semi-final bout (The Chinese victory was very controversial). He proceeded into the bronze medal match, where he was defeated by Bulgaria's Yavor Yanakiev, and finished only in fifth place. Most specialists in the Greco-Roman style are sure that only biased refereeing did not allow Oleg Mikhalovich to rise to the Olympic podium.

Oleg Mikhalovich is a multiple champion of the Republic of Belarus, as well as the winner of many "A" class tournaments. His sports achievements include a bronze medal at the 2004 European Championship in Greco-Roman wrestling in Finland, as well as a silver medal at the 2006 European Championship in Moscow

References

External links
 NBC Olympic Profile
 

Living people
1979 births
Olympic wrestlers of Belarus
Wrestlers at the 2008 Summer Olympics
Belarusian male sport wrestlers
Sportspeople from Minsk
21st-century Belarusian people
20th-century Belarusian people